Blanchester Local Schools is a public school district in southwestern Ohio.  The district serves approximately 1,850 students from Brown, Clermont, Clinton and Warren Counties.

Schools
In 2002, the district opened a new high school and elementary school.  Extensive renovations were done to the existing Junior and Senior High schools, turning them into the Intermediate and Middle schools.  At that same time Jefferson Elementary and Main Street Middle School were closed.

References

External links
Blanchester Local Schools website

Education in Brown County, Ohio
Education in Clermont County, Ohio
Education in Clinton County, Ohio
School districts in Ohio
Education in Warren County, Ohio